The men's road race at the 1975 UCI Road World Championships was the 42nd edition of the event. The race took place on Sunday 31 August 1975 in Yvoir, Belgium. The race was won by Hennie Kuiper of the Netherlands.

Final classification

References

Men's Road Race
UCI Road World Championships – Men's road race
1975 Super Prestige Pernod